Stade du 18 novembre is a multi-use stadium in Khemisset, Morocco.  It is used mostly for football matches and hosts the home games of IZK Khemisset.  The stadium holds 10,000 people.

External links

 Stadium pictures

Football venues in Morocco
Buildings and structures in Rabat-Salé-Kénitra
Ittihad Khemisset